Soulside Journey is the first studio album by Norwegian black metal band Darkthrone. It was released 13 January 1991 by Peaceville Records. It is notable as the band's only death metal album, before they became an integral part of the Norwegian black metal scene.

Background
The band's drummer, Fenriz, used the nickname "Hank Amarillo". Being that they had finally made it "big" and released an album, and due to his negativity toward the then-crop of death metal bands, Fenriz thought it would be appropriate to mockingly choose a "Western" name. Later pressings of the albums listed all of the band's pseudonyms rather than their real names.

Reissue
The album was remastered and reissued by Peaceville in 2003, as well as being repackaged in a cardboard digipak. The first chapter of a four-part video interview with Fenriz and Nocturno Culto, spanning the first four albums, was also included as bonus material.

Track listing

Credits

Darkthrone
 Nocturno Culto – vocals and lead guitar
 Zephyrous – rhythm guitar
 Dag Nilsen – bass guitar
 Fenriz – drums

Other staff
 Nimbus - Mastering
 Tomas Skogsberg - Producer
 Gylve Nagell - Photography, design, logo
 Duncan Fegredo - Cover art

References

Darkthrone albums
1991 debut albums
Death metal albums by Norwegian artists
Peaceville Records albums